The Uzina Pagoda, also known as the U Zina Pagaoda, is a Buddhist temple in Mawlamyine, Mon State, Myanmar. Built in the 19th century, the temple contains hairs allegedly from the Buddha, and contains several sculptures symbolizing scene's from the Buddha's life. The temple itself is often associated with gemstones and wish fulfillment.

References 

Buddhist temples in Myanmar
19th-century Buddhist temples
Pagodas in Myanmar